Mont Wright was a mountain in Fermont, Quebec, a site of major iron ore mining operations since the 1970s by Québec Cartier Mining Company. It is located in Caniapiscau Regional County Municipality.

Today's production of Québec Cartier ore comes from nearby Mont Survie and Paul's Peek mountain.

References 

Wright
Mines in Quebec
Landforms of Côte-Nord
Iron mines in Canada
Surface mines in Canada